Aboubacar Sidiki Camara is a Guinean politician and army general who has served as Minister of Defence in the Cabinet of Guinea since 2021.

Career 
Camara is a former army officer who was appointed to the government following the ousting of President Alpha Condé. In Summer 2021, he made his first overseas trip, visiting France and met with Minister of the Armed Forces Florence Parly.

References 
Living people
Place of birth missing (living people)
Year of birth missing (living people)
Defense ministers of Guinea
21st-century Guinean politicians
Guinean generals
Guinean diplomats